This is a list of notable members of the fraternity Sigma Alpha Epsilon.

Milton Eisenhower, President Kansas State University, president Johns Hopkins University.

Literature

William Faulkner – Nobel Prize-winning author, University of Mississippi
Albert Jay Nock – author and social critic
Walker Percy – Southern author, UNC Chapel Hill
Sandro Corsaro – author and American Animator
John Jakes – author, DePauw University
George Abbe – poet and author, University of New Hampshire
Stuart Woods – author, University of Georgia

Music

Media and entertainment

George Bodenheimer – president of ESPN Inc. and ESPN on ABC
Lloyd Bridges – actor, UCLA
Beau Bridges – actor
Dave Campbell – ESPN baseball broadcaster, University of Michigan
Danny Lee Clark – Nitro from the original American Gladiators, San Jose State University
Sandro Corsaro – producer/TV show creator University of Southern California
James Denton – actor – Desperate Housewives, University of Tennessee
Ross M. Dick – journalist at The Milwaukee Journal and fourth president of the Society for Advancing Business Editing and Writing
Jack Edwards – former ESPN Broadcaster and current NESN play-by-play announcer for the Boston Bruins, University of New Hampshire
Sam Elliott – actor, Cal State L.A.
Bob Eubanks – television personality, game show host
Barry Fanaro – screenwriter, The Golden Girls, Kingpin, Mercer University
Carmen Finestra – television producer and writer (The Cosby Show, Home Improvement), Penn State University
Ron Franklin – ESPN college football and basketball broadcaster, University of Mississippi
Gregory Thomas Garcia – creator and producer My Name is Earl, Yes, Dear, Frostburg State University
George Gallup – creator of Gallup Poll, University of Iowa
Terry Gilliam – film director, member of Monty Python, Occidental College
Bob Goen – former co-host of Entertainment Tonight, San Diego State University
Philip Graham – former publisher of the Washington Post and Newsweek, University of Florida
John Lee Hancock – film director, The Blind Side, Baylor University
Ernie Harwell – former baseball broadcaster for the Detroit Tigers, Emory University
Ed Hinton – ESPN NASCAR columnist, University of Southern Mississippi
Chet Huntley – NBC news anchor Montana State University
Paul James – actor – television show Greek, Syracuse University
James J. Kilpatrick – syndicated newspaper columnist, author, University of Missouri
Richard Kind – actor – Spin City, Northwestern University
Steven Levitan - writer/producer University of Wisconsin-Madison
Matt Long – actor, Western Kentucky University
David McKenna – writer/producer of Blow, American History X, San Diego State University
Ross Porter - former baseball announcer for the Los Angeles Dodgers, University of Oklahoma
Ernie Pyle – Pulitzer Prize winning World War II journalist, Indiana University
Michael Rosenbaum – actor, Lex Luthor: Smallville, Western Kentucky University
Hughes Rudd – CBS News anchor, correspondent, University of Missouri
Ryen Russillo – co-host of The Scott Van Pelt Show on ESPN Radio, University of Vermont
Fred Savage – actor – Wonder Years, Stanford University
Grant Shaud – actor on Murphy Brown, University of Richmond
David Spade – actor – Saturday Night Live, Arizona State University
Charles Strum – Associate managing editor for the New York Times, Dickinson College
Kevin Tighe – actor, University of Southern California
Casper Van Dien – actor Starship Troopers, Beverly Hills 90210 Florida State University
Ed Wilson – president of Tribune Broadcasting (Tribune Company), former president of Fox Television, NBC Enterprises, and CBS Enterprises, University of Arkansas
Robert S. Woods – actor One Life to Live Long Beach State University
Robert Young – Actor - Father Knows Best, Marcus Welby, MD Depauw University
Mike Song – dancer, founder of Kaba Modern University of California, Irvine

Business

Education

Government

President
William McKinley – Twenty-fifth President of the United States (R), Mount Union College

U.S. Senate

U.S. House of Representatives

Governors

Mayors
Ivan Allen Jr. – former Mayor of Atlanta (D), Georgia Tech
Joe Hogsett – Current Mayor of Indianapolis (D), Indiana University
Carl T. Langford – former Mayor of Orlando (D), University of Florida
Svante Myrick – Current Mayor of Ithaca, New York (D), Cornell University
Jerry Sanders  – former Mayor of San Diego (R), San Diego State University

Other government officials
Henry M. Paulson – former U.S. Treasury Secretary, Former CEO of Goldman Sachs Group, Dartmouth College
Todd Blodgett - Member of White House staff (Reagan-Bush) 1985-87. Served on Bush-Quayle '88 campaign committee. Also worked with the FBI.
Andrew McCabe – Director of the Federal Bureau of Investigation, Duke University
Michael Geppi – former Harford County Councilman (R), Towson University
Andrew O. Holmes – Associate Justice of the Tennessee Supreme Court
L.Q.C. Lamar – Statesman (D), Justice of US Supreme Court, University of Mississippi
Robert E. Lamb – United States Foreign Service, University of Pennsylvania
Wilson Livingood – Sergeant at Arms of the United States House of Representatives, Michigan State University
Richard Myers – former chairman, Joint Chief of Staff, Kansas State University
Eliot Ness – Prohibition agent, University of Chicago
Charles Price II – former Ambassador to the United Kingdom University of Missouri
Donald Evans – former US Secretary of Commerce, University of Texas at Austin
Richard Riley – former US Secretary of Education, Former Governor of South Carolina (D), Furman University
Pat Robertson – Christian leader, 1988 presidential candidate (R), Washington and Lee University
Kenneth Schissler – former Maryland State Delegate (R), Salisbury State University
Mark Taylor – former Georgia State Senator representing the 12th District, Former Lieutenant Governor of Georgia, Emory University
Louis R. Tobacco – New York State Assemblyman representing Staten Island's 62nd District (R), University at Albany
Guy Vander Linden – a member of Iowa Legislature and former brigadier general, US Marines, University of Iowa
GEN Charles C. Campbell, USA (Ret.) – US Army general (retired), former FORSCOM commander, and last continuously serving army officer with Vietnam experience, Louisiana State University
Edmund Kirby Smith – general, Confederate States of America, The University of the South
Bruce L. Castor, Jr. –  former solicitor general and acting attorney general of Pennsylvania, former district attorney and commissioner of Montgomery County, Pennsylvania; noted trial lawyer, Lafayette College
John R. Bell, IV – House Majority Whip, 10th NC House District, North Carolina House of Representatives (R) University of North Carolina at Wilmington
James R. Williams – Selectman, Belmont, MA, Indiana University
Dana T. Merrill – United States Army brigadier general
Seymour W. Terry - United States Army Captain, World War II Medal of Honor Recipient, University of Arkansas
William Peterkin Upshur - United States Marine Corps Major General, Awarded the Medal of Honor for his actions in World War I, Virginia Military Institute 
Arlo L. Olson - United States Army Captain, Awarded the Medal of Honor for his actions in World War II, University of South Dakota

Science

Sports

Baseball

Basketball

American football

Golf
{{columns-list|colwidth=35em|
Andy Bean – golf announcer, player on the PGA Champions Tour, University of Florida
Bob Gilder – golfer, PGA Champions Tour, Arizona State University
Bobby Jones – famous amateur golfer/lawyer, founder of Augusta National Golf Club and the Masters Tournament, Georgia Tech
Gary Koch – golfer, sportscaster, course designer, University of Florida
Tom Purtzer – golfer, PGA Champions Tour, Arizona State University
Steve Melnyk – golfer, University of Florida
Bob Murphy - golfer, long time sports announcer, NCAA Golf individual champion, US Amateur champion, University of Florida

Tennis
Bob Bryan – tennis player, Stanford University
Mike Bryan – tennis player, Stanford University
Bradley Klahn - tennis player, Stanford University
Patrick McEnroe – tennis professional, Stanford University

Other sports

References

External links
Official SAE Website (Fraterity Service Center)

Sigma Alpha Epsilon
members